Satan's Harvest is a 1970 South African adventure film directed by George Montgomery who also starred along with Tippi Hedren and singer Matt Monro.

Plot

After inheriting a farm in South Africa, Cutter Murdock, an American private detective, travels to South Africa to claim his inheritance and almost immediately finds himself in serious danger. Following an attempted assassination while leaving the plane at Jan Smuts Airport (the person behind him is shot dead) and a further attempt on his life when his chauffeur and car are blown to hell, he is also targeted by the gun-toting Marla Oaks, who shoots at him as soon as he gets out of his plane.

There are people who want Murdock’s farm—interloper family members who were excluded from Murdock’s uncle’s will—as the farm is a heroin and marijuana goldmine and nothing will stand in their way, not even the resourceful American detective.

Cast 
George Montgomery as Cutter Murdock
Tippi Hedren as Marla Oaks
Matt Monro as Bates
Davy Kaye as Trigger
Brian O'Shaughnessy as Andrew
Roland Robinson as Timothy
Tromp Terreblanche as Uncle Craig
Ian Yule as Jonas/Jake
Simon Sabela as Foreman

Soundtrack 
Two People

Composed by Don Black & Denis King

Sung by Matt Monro

other music in the film is by

Roy Martin

References

External links 

1970 films
English-language South African films
1970s adventure films
1970 in South Africa
Films set in South Africa
South African adventure films
1970s English-language films